Sony Lab'ou Tansi (5 July 1947 – 14 June 1995), born Marcel Ntsoni, was a Congolese novelist, short-story writer, playwright, and poet in French language. Though he was only 47 when he died, Tansi remains one of the most prolific African writers and the most internationally renowned practitioner of the "New African Writing." His novel The Antipeople won the Grand Prix Littéraire d'Afrique Noire. In his later years, he ran a theatrical company in Brazzaville in the Republic of the Congo.

Life and career
The oldest of seven children, Tansi was born in the former Belgian Congo, in the village of Kimwaanza, just south of the city now known as Kinshasa in the modern day Democratic Republic of the Congo. He was initially educated in the local language, Kikongo, and only began speaking French at the age of twelve, when his family moved to Congo-Brazzaville, today known as the Republic of the Congo. He attended the École Normale Supérieure d'Afrique Centrale in Brazzaville where he studied literature, and upon completing his education in 1971, he became a French and English teacher in Kindamba and Pointe-Noire. When the young teacher began writing for the theatre later that year, he adopted the pen name "Sony La'bou Tansi" as a tribute to Tchicaya U Tam'si, a fellow Congolese writer who wrote politically charged poetry about oppressive nature of the state.

In the early part of his career, Tansi continued to support himself through teaching and he worked as an English instructor at the Collège Tchicaya-Pierre in Pointe Noire while working on his first two novels and several plays. In 1979 he founded the Rocado Zulu Theatre, which would go on to perform his plays in Africa, Europe, and the United States in addition to appearing regularly at the Festival International des Francophonies in Limoges.

After teaching for many years, Tansi  moved on to government work, serving as an administrator in several ministries in Brazzaville. In the late 1980s he allied with opposition leader Bernard Kolélas to found the Congolese Movement for Democracy and Integral Development (MCDDI), a political party acting against the communist regime of President Denis Sassou Nguesso and his Congolese Labour Party. Left-wing forces succeeded in pushing President Sassou toward democracy, and former Prime Minister Pascal Lissouba returned from an extended exile and was elected President in the August 1992 elections. In that same year, Tansi was elected to parliament as a deputy for the Makélékélé arrondissement of Brazzaville, but his participation in opposition politics angered President Lissouba, and his passport was withdrawn in 1994.

Tansi soon discovered that he had contracted the AIDS virus, but Lissouba's travel restrictions prevented him from going abroad to seek treatment for himself and his wife. Tansi's partner, Pierrette, died from the disease on 31 May 1995 and Tansi followed 14 days later.

Works in English
 Parentheses of Blood, a play. Trans. Lorraine Alexander Veach. New York: Ubu Repertory Theater Publications, 1986. 
 The Antipeople, a novel. Trans. J.A. Underwood. and M. Boyars. New York: Kampmann, 1988. 
 "An Open Letter To Africans" c/o The Punic One-Party State, an essay. Trans. John Conteh-Morgran. Published in Tejumola Olaniyan and Ato Quayson's African Literature: An Anthology of Criticism and Theory. Malden: Blackwell Publishers, 1990.
 The Seven Solitudes of Lorsa Lopez. Trans. Clive Wake. Portsmouth: Heinemann, 1995. 
 Life and a Half, trans. Alison Dundy (Indiana University Press, 2011)

Works in French
 Conscience de tracteur (Dakar: Nouvelles Éditions Africaines / Yaoundé: Clé, 1979).
 La vie et demie: Roman (Paris: Seuil, 1979).
 Je soussigné cardiaque (Paris: Haitier, 1981).
 L'état honteux: Roman (Paris: Seuil, 1981).
 La parenthèse de sang (Paris: Haitier, 1981)
 L'anté-peuple (Paris: Seuil, 1983)
 Les sept solitudes de Lorsa Lopez: Roman (Paris: Seuil, 1985)
 Cinq ans de littératures africaines: 1979-1984 (Paris: C.L.E.F, 1985).
 Un citoyen de ce siècle (Paris: Equateur, 1986)comprises "Lettre ouverte à l'humanité" and Antoine m'a vendu son destin.
 Francophonie: 2 pièces (Paris: L'avant-scène, 1987)comprises Moi, veuve de l'empire, by Sony Labou Tansi, and Témoignage contre un homme stérile, by Fatima Gallaire.
 Le coup de vieux: Drâme en deux souffles (Paris & Dakar: Présence Africaine, 1988).
 Les yeux du volcan: Roman (Paris: Seuil, 1988).
 Qui a mangé Madame d'Avoine Bergotha? (Carnières, Belgium: Lansman, 1989).
 La résurrection rouge et blanche de Roméo et Juliette (Arles: Actes Sud, 1990).
 Une chouette petite vie bien osée (Carnières, Belgium: Lansman, 1992).
 Théâtre, 3 volumes (Carnières, Belgium: Lansman, 1995–1998)v1 comprises Qu'ils le disent, qu'elles le beuglent and Qui a mangé Madame d'Avoine Bergotha?; v 2 Bevat: Une vie en arbre et chars . . . bonds and Une chouette petite vie bien osée; v3 Monologue d'or et noces d'argent and Le trou.
 Le commencement des douleurs (Paris: Seuil, 1995).
 Poèmes et vents lisses (Paris: Le Bruit des Autres, 1995).
 L'autre monde: Écrits inédits, edited by Nicolas Martin-Granel and Bruno Tilliette (Paris: Revue Noire, 1997).
 L'atelier de Sony Labou Tansi, ed. Martin-Granel and Greta Rodriguez-Antoniotti' (Paris: Revue Noire, 2005)--comprises v1, Correspondance: Lettres à José Pivin (1973-1976) and Lettres à Françoise Ligier (1973-1983); v2, Poésie; and v3, Machin la hernie: Roman.
 Paroles inédites: La rue des mouches (comédie tragique), Entretiens, Lettres à Sony, ed. Bernard Magnier'' (Montreuil-sous-Bois: Éditions Théâtrales, 2005).

References

1947 births
1995 deaths
People from Kinshasa
Democratic Republic of the Congo emigrants to the Republic of the Congo
Republic of the Congo writers
AIDS-related deaths in the Republic of the Congo